Denis "Snake" Bélanger (born August 9, 1964) is a Canadian singer and songwriter. He is the lead singer and lyricist of heavy metal band Voivod.

Early life
Bélanger grew up in Jonquière, Quebec.

Career
Bélanger joined Michel Langevin, Denis D'Amour and Jean-Yves Thériault to form Voivod in 1982, in northern Quebec. He appeared on the albums War & Pain, Rrröööaaarrr, Killing Technology, Dimension Hatröss, Nothingface, Angel Rat and The Outer Limits. 

Bélanger departed the group in 1994, after completing a tour in support of The Outer Limits.  He formed his own band, Union Made with Peter Jackson and worked on the song "Dictatosaurus" with Dave Grohl's side project dubbed Probot.

Bélanger rejoined Voivod in 2002 and appeared on the albums, Voivod (2003), Katorz (2006), Infini (2009), Target Earth (2013), and The Wake (2018). This last album won a Juno Award for Heavy Metal Album of the Year.

References

Canadian heavy metal singers
Canadian male singers
Singers from Quebec
1964 births
Living people
Musicians from Saguenay, Quebec
Voivod (band) members
Place of birth missing (living people)